Bangladesh special operations forces are military units trained to conduct special operations. They are "specially designated, organized, trained, and equipped forces, manned with selected personnel, using unconventional tactics, techniques, and modes of employment".

History
During the Bangladesh Liberation War, a naval commando unit was placed under Commander-in-chief Colonel M. A. G. Osmani. They conducted major special operations in the seaport of Chittagong and at river ports Mongla, Narayanganj, and Chandpur. The Crack Platoon was another specially trained unit of the Bangladesh Forces.

The first post-independence special forces were launched in 1992.

Composition
Bangladesh Army
 1st Para-Commando Brigade

Bangladesh Navy
 Special Warfare Diving and Salvage (SWADS)
Bangladesh airforce
41 Squadron Airborne

References

Bangladesh